The following is a list of Radio Disney Music Award winners and nominees for Best Female Artist. Hilary Duff is the most awarded artist in this category with 4 wins.

Winners and nominees

2000s

2010s

References

Female Artist
Music awards honoring women